Paul Colomb de Batines (14 November 1811 – 14 January 1855) was a 19th-century French bibliographer, librarian and bibliophile. His name remains attached to his great work, a Bibliografia dantesca, "scholarship treasure" (Paolo Trovato, Un falso visconte, due edizioni elettroniche e altri libri su Dante, 451 via della letteratura, della scienza e dell’arte, issue 5, 2010) which is - still in the early twenty-first century - a valuable tool for any literary history study of Dante's work.

In 1829, Colomb de Batines created the library of Gap.

In the 1840s, he took the title "vicomte de Batines" after he left France and settled in Florence.

Publications 
 Bibliografia dantesca, ossia Catalogo delle edizioni, traduzioni, codici manoscritti e comenti della ‘Divina Commedia’ e delle opere minori di Dante, seguito dalla serie de’ biografi di lui, Prato, Tipografia Aldina, 1845-1846, in 2 vol.
Note : this edition will be completed with a third posthumous volume containing notes and manuscripts addition by Columbus de Batines : Giunte e correzioni inedite alla Bibliografica dantesca, éd. par Guido Biagi, Florence, Sansoni, 1888 
 Réédition anastatique de la précédente : Rome, Salerno Editrice, « Biblioteca storica dantesca », 2008, in 3 vol.
Note: the third volume contains the general index, the Giunte e correzioni (additions and corrections) index, a postface by Stefano Zamponi in collaboration with Mauro Guerrini and Rossano De Laurentiis, and an index of the manuscripts established by Irene Ceccherini 
Catalogs of his library and bookshop
 Catalogue d'une partie des livres composant la bibliothèque de M. C. de B. [Colombe de Batines], 26 November 1839 auction, Lyon, Fontaine, 1839
 Notice d'une partie des livres, 18 April 1845 auction, Paris, Délion, 1845
Books related to Dauphiné
 See a list of these works on the site of the Bibliothèque Dauphinoise

References

External links 
 Paul Colomb de Batines on data.bnf.fr

French bibliographers
French librarians
French bibliophiles
People from Gap, Hautes-Alpes
1811 births
1855 deaths